The 2022–23 Bahraini Premier League (also known as Nasser Bin Hamad Premier League for sponsorship reasons), is the 66th top-level football season in Bahrain. The season started on 11 September 2022.

Team location

League table

Results

Positions by round
The table lists the positions of teams after each week of matches.

Season statistics
Updated to matches played on 28 January 2023

Top scorers

Hat-tricks

Notes

References

Bahraini Premier League seasons
Premier League
Bahrain